The 2018 Wests Tigers season was the 19th in the Wests Tigers's history. They completed the NRL's 2018 Telstra Premiership season in ninth place and did not qualify for the  finals.

2018 Signings/Transfers
Sources:

Gains

Josh Reynolds from  Canterbury-Bankstown Bulldogs
Chris McQueen from  Gold Coast Titans
Ben Matulino from  New Zealand Warriors
Taane Milne from  St. George Illawarra Dragons
Russell Packer from  St. George Illawarra Dragons
Tyson Gamble from  Redcliffe Dolphins
Mahe Fonua from  Hull F.C.
Corey Thompson from  Widnes Vikings
Benji Marshall from  Brisbane Broncos
Pita Godinet from  Manly Warringah Sea Eagles
Robbie Farah from  South Sydney Rabbitohs

Out
James Tedesco to  Sydney Roosters
Aaron Woods to  Canterbury-Bankstown Bulldogs
Matt Ballin to Retirement
Ava Seumanufagai to  Cronulla-Sutherland Sharks
Ryan Papenhuyzen to  Melbourne Storm
Jack Littlejohn to  Salford Red Devils November 2017
Kyle Lovett to  Leigh Centurions November 2017
Jeremy Marshall-King to  Canterbury-Bankstown Bulldogs November 2017
Moses Suli to  Canterbury-Bankstown Bulldogs February 2018

Season summary

Milestones
Round 1 (vs. Sydney Roosters): Corey Thompson (209), Russell Packer (210), Pita Godinet (211), Ben Matulino (212) and Robbie Rochow (213) make their Wests Tigers debut.  
Round 1 (vs. Sydney Roosters): Benji Marshall makes his return to the club after playing with St. George Illawarra Dragons and Brisbane Broncos. 
Round 5 (vs. Melbourne Storm): Chris Lawrence becomes all-time leading Wests Tigers try scorer (77).
Round 6 (vs. Manly): Josh Reynolds (214) makes his Wests Tigers debut.
Round 7 (vs. Newcastle Knights): Kevin Naiqama 100th plays his NRL first grade game (including matches with Newcastle Knights and Penrith Panthers). 
Round 8 (vs. Parramatta Eels): Mahe Fonua (215) makes his Wests Tigers debut.
Round 11 (vs. Penrith Panthers): Chris McQueen (216) makes his Wests Tigers debut. 
Round 13 (vs. Sydney Roosters): Elijah Taylor plays in his 150th NRL first grade game.  
Round 15 (vs. Canberra Raiders): Tyson Gamble (216) makes his NRL debut. 
Round 11 (vs. Canberra Raiders): Josh Aloiai played his 50th game for the Wests Tigers.

Squad
2018 Wests Tigers Squad:

References 

Wests Tigers seasons
Wests Tigers seasons